Kaigetsudō Anchi (active ) was a Japanese artist of the Kaigetsudō school of ukiyo-e art.  He was the student and likely the son of the school's founder, Kaigetsudō Ando.

As is the case with most of the Kaigetsudō artists, the details of Anchi's life are almost completely unknown. His works, like those of other members of the school, are almost exclusively paintings, and of those almost all are of courtesans in exquisite kimono. His few woodblock prints are of the same subjects and style, and were likely a special commission. Though his works follow very much the distinctive style of Ando (and thus of the school as whole), Richard Lane points out that the attitude and emotion of the women in Anchi's works differs from those of his teacher. He writes, "whereas Ando's women can often pass for maidens of ladies of quality, Anchi's girls are manifestly courtesans, lovely but at the same time somehow predatory. They seem to be thinking only of themselves; most men would think twice before putting their love into such hands."

References
 Lane, Richard. (1978).  Images from the Floating World, The Japanese Print. Oxford: Oxford University Press. ;  OCLC 5246796

18th-century Japanese artists
Anchi
Year of birth unknown
Year of death unknown
Year of birth uncertain